Virginia is a city in St. Louis County, Minnesota, United States, on the Mesabi Iron Range. With an economy heavily reliant on large-scale iron ore mining, Virginia is considered the Mesabi Range's commercial center. The population was 8,423 at the 2020 census. Virginia is a part of the Duluth metropolitan area and U.S. Highway 53 runs through town.

History
Virginia was laid out in 1892, and named after Virginia, the native state of a large share of the lumbermen in the area at the time. A post office has been in operation at Virginia since 1893. Virginia was incorporated in February 1895. It was a logging community first, then developed as an iron mining community. The Virginia area mines were prosperous and setting new records consistently by the late 1890s. The main population boom began after mining camps were built for entrepreneurs and financiers including Andrew Carnegie, Leonidas Merritt, Jay Cooke, John D. Rockefeller, William J. Olcott, and James J. Hill. With the use of diamond drills, mules, and a massive labor force, the mines moved millions of tons per year and shipped them out of the Twin Ports of Duluth and Superior, as well as Two Harbors.

Geography

Lakes in Virginia include Silver Lake and Bailey Lake. The area was originally named Qeechaquepagem by an Ojibwe tribe, which roughly means "lake of the north birds."

Virginia is part of the Quad Cities, which include nearby Eveleth, Gilbert, and Mountain Iron.

Climate
The Köppen Climate Classification subtype for this climate is "Dfb" (Warm Summer Continental Climate). Summers are warm, sometimes hot, and winters are severely cold.

Demographics

2010 census
As of the census of 2010, there were 8,712 people, 4,242 households, and 2,019 families living in the city. The racial makeup of the city was 94.7% White, 0.6% African American, 1.0% Native American, 0.5% Asian, 0.3% from other races, and 2.9% from two or more races. Hispanic or Latino of any race were 1.5% of the population.

There were 4,242 households, of which 21.8% had children under the age of 18 living with them, 31.7% were married couples living together, 12.0% had a female householder with no husband present, 4.0% had a male householder with no wife present, and 52.4% were non-families. 46.3% of all households were made up of individuals, and 20% had someone living alone who was 65 years of age or older. The average household size was 1.95 and the average family size was 2.74.

The median age in the city was 44.9 years. 18.9% of residents were under the age of 18; 9.3% were between the ages of 18 and 24; 21.8% were from 25 to 44; 27.9% were from 45 to 64; and 22% were 65 years of age or older. The gender makeup of the city was 47.9% male and 52.1% female.

2000 census
As of the census of 2000, there were 9,157 people, 4,333 households, and 2,270 families living in the city. The racial makeup of the city was 95.17% White, 0.46% African American, 2.24% Native American, 0.55% Asian, 0.01% Pacific Islander, 0.17% from other races, and 1.40% from two or more races. Hispanic or Latino of any race were 0.80% of the population. 21.4% were of Finnish, 13.3% German, 9.9% Norwegian, 8.8% Italian, and 7.8% Swedish ancestry.

There were 4,333 households, out of which 22.5% had children under the age of 18 living with them, 38.4% were married couples living together, 10.7% had a female householder with no husband present, and 47.6% were non-families. 42.6% of all households were made up of individuals, and 19.6% had someone living alone who was 65 years of age or older. The average household size was 2.00 and the average family size was 2.73.

In the city, the population was spread out, with 19.0% under the age of 18, 9.4% from 18 to 24, 25.0% from 25 to 44, 23.3% from 45 to 64, and 23.2% who were 65 years of age or older. The median age was 43 years. For every 100 females, there were 88.4 males. For every 100 females age 18 and over, there were 85.9 males.

The median income for a household in the city was $28,873, and the median income for a family was $43,419. Males had a median income of $38,834 versus $22,473 for females. The per capita income for the city was $17,776. About 10.6% of families and 15.9% of the population were below the poverty line, including 16.6% of those under age 18 and 10.0% of those age 65 or over.

Politics

{| align="center" border="2" cellpadding="4" cellspacing="0" style="float:right; margin: 1em 1em 1em 0; border: 1px #aaa solid; border-collapse: collapse; font-size: 95%;"
|+ Precinct General Election Results
|- bgcolor=lightgrey
! Year
! Republican
! Democratic
! Third parties
|-
|  style="text-align:center;" |2020
|  style="text-align:center;" |47.8% 2,040
|  style="text-align:center;" |50.0% 2,134|  style="text-align:center; background:honeyDew;"|2.2% 98|-
|  style="text-align:center;" |2016
|  style="text-align:center;" |44.1% 1,854|  style="text-align:center;" |47.0% 1,976|  style="text-align:center; background:honeyDew;"|8.9% 375|-
|  style="text-align:center;" |2012
|  style="text-align:center;" |34.5% 1,607|  style="text-align:center;" |62.3% 2,902|  style="text-align:center; background:honeyDew;"|3.2% 148|-
|  style="text-align:center;" |2008
|  style="text-align:center;" |33.4% 1,612|  style="text-align:center;" |64.0% 3,090|  style="text-align:center; background:honeyDew;"|2.6% 125|-
|  style="text-align:center;" |2004
|  style="text-align:center;" |32.1% 1,595|  style="text-align:center;" |66.6% 3,310|  style="text-align:center; background:honeyDew;"|1.3% 66|-
|  style="text-align:center;" |2000
|  style="text-align:center;" |30.5% 1,453|  style="text-align:center;" |60.8% 2,901|  style="text-align:center; background:honeyDew;"|8.7% 416|-
|  style="text-align:center;" |1996
|  style="text-align:center;" |23.3% 1,066|  style="text-align:center;" |66.3% 3,036|  style="text-align:center; background:honeyDew;"|10.4% 479|-
|  style="text-align:center;" |1992
|  style="text-align:center;" |20.8% 1,064|  style="text-align:center;" |62.2% 3,183|  style="text-align:center; background:honeyDew;"|17.0% 871|-
|  style="text-align:center;" |1988
|  style="text-align:center;" |27.5% 1,476|  style="text-align:center;" |72.5% 3,885|  style="text-align:center; background:honeyDew;"|0.0% 0|-
|  style="text-align:center;" |1984
|  style="text-align:center;" |30.4% 1,790|  style="text-align:center;" |69.6% 4,102|  style="text-align:center; background:honeyDew;"|0.0% 0|-
|  style="text-align:center;" |1980
|  style="text-align:center;" |32.7% 2,004|  style="text-align:center;" |59.4% 3,637|  style="text-align:center; background:honeyDew;"|7.8% 479|-
|  style="text-align:center;" |1976
|  style="text-align:center;" |34.1% 2,296|  style="text-align:center;" |64.0% 4,309|  style="text-align:center; background:honeyDew;"|1.9% 130|-
|  style="text-align:center;" |1968
|  style="text-align:center;" |28.6% 1,829|  style="text-align:center;" |69.4% 4,429|  style="text-align:center; background:honeyDew;"|2.0% 128|-
|  style="text-align:center;" |1964
|  style="text-align:center;" |28.5% 1,968|  style="text-align:center;" |71.4% 4,935|  style="text-align:center; background:honeyDew;"|0.1% 12|-
|  style="text-align:center;" |1960
|  style="text-align:center;" |39.7% 2,809|  style="text-align:center;" |60.1% 4,254|  style="text-align:center; background:honeyDew;"|0.2% 11|}

Economy
Virginia is on the Mesabi Range, one of the sub-regions of Minnesota's Iron Range. It is considered the Mesabi Range's commerce center. Virginia serves as a shopping, industrial, educational, and medical hub for surrounding communities.

Arts and culture
Virginia is the home of the Land of the Loon festival, an annual event in June.

Points of interest
 B'nai Abraham Synagogue
 Laurentian Divide
 Lyric Center for the Arts (Historic Lyric Opera House)
 Mesabi Trail
 Olcott Park Greenhouse

Urban area
The Virginia urban area is relatively large, spread out to a 30-mile radius. The major cities are Virginia, Hibbing, Mountain Iron, Eveleth, Gilbert, Fayal, and Chisholm. Virginia is the area's commercial hub, while Hibbing has a large residential population. 45 miles south is Duluth, a significantly larger city. Virginia is also part of the Duluth MN-WI Metropolitan Area. The Duluth Metro is the second-largest metro in Minnesota.

Parks and recreation
Olcott Park is a city park in Virginia. It has a fountain in the northern part of the park, built in 1937. There is a bandstand in the center, used mainly for city band performances. To the south it borders Parkview Learning Center, to the east 9th Avenue West, to the north 9th Street North, and to the west Greenwood Cemetery. Olcott Park is also home to the Olcott Park Greenhouse. It is named after William J. Olcott, who headed the Oliver Iron Mining Company, the largest mining company on the Iron Range for decades.

Education
The public high school is Rock Ridge Public Schools, and the public elementary schools are Parkview Learning Center (early childhood programs through second grade) and Roosevelt Elementary (grades three through six). The higher education institution for the city is Mesabi Range Community and Technical College. The Virginia Public Library is also featured as an educational place for people of all ages. Marquette Catholic School is a private elementary school operated by the Duluth Diocese. Northland Learning Center, a cooperative alternative school for students with disciplinary problems or other special circumstances, operates in the former James Madison Elementary School, which is owned by ISD No. 706.

Sports
Virginia High School is the home of the Blue Devils. Starting with the 2022-23 school year, Virginia and Eveleth-Gilbert High Schools combined into a new high school, Rock Ridge High School, with new mascot the Wolverines (a blend of the Virginia Blue Devils and the Eveleth-Gilbert Bears).

The main high school sport in Virginia is ice hockey. Virginia's primary hockey arena is the Miners Memorial Building. A new complex, the Miners Event and Convention Center (MECC), with two planned ice arenas, is under construction. The MECC will incorporate many elements from the Miners Building, such as its ice arena seats.

Media
News media
 The Mesabi Tribune'', newspaper published in Virginia and Hibbing

Television
Stations serving Virginia are received from the Duluth television market:
 3 KDLH – CBS
 6 / 11 KBJR – NBC
 8 / 31 WDSE – PBS
 10 / 13 WDIO – ABC
 21 KQDS – Fox

Infrastructure

Transportation
Virginia is a regional transportation hub within the Mesabi Range. Major roadways include U.S. routes 53 and 169 and State Highway 135 (MN 135). Other main routes include 2nd Avenue West, 12th Avenue West, 13th Street South, 8th Street South, and 9th Street North. Downtown Virginia is centered along Chestnut Street. Arrowhead Transportation also allows for city bussing through the Virginia Metro area.

In 2017, the U.S. 53 Bridge was built. It is the tallest bridge in Minnesota and the main bridge from the freeway from southern Minnesota to the northern state. in 2021, the bridge was renamed the Thomas Rukavina Memorial Bridge.

Notable people
 W. T. Bailey, lumber industrialist
 Daniel Berrigan, peace activist
 Luke F. Burns, lawyer and Minnesota state legislator
 Jack Carlson, professional hockey player
 Jeff Carlson, professional hockey player
 Steve Carlson, professional hockey player 
 Mark Cullen, professional hockey player
 Matt Cullen, professional hockey player
 Peter X. Fugina, educator and Minnesota state legislator
 John Gruden, professional hockey player 
 Frank Haege, professional and collegiate football coach
 John Harrington, hockey player, member of the 1980 Miracle on Ice team that won the Olympic gold medal
 Edwin H. Hoff, Minnesota state legislator
 Warren Johnson, auto racer, member of Motorsports Hall of Fame of America
 Vic Kulbitski, football player
 Pete LoPresti, professional hockey player
 Robert W. Mattson, Sr., Minnesota attorney general
 Robert Mondavi, winemaker
 Matt Niskanen, professional hockey player
 Johnny Norlander, professional basketball player
 Chris Pratt, actor
 Alex Rozier, journalist
 Sherman Walt, bassoonist
 Leonard C. Ward, United States Army Brigadier General
 Thomas D. Yukelich, Minnesota state legislator

References

External links

Virginia, Minnesota – City Government website

 
Cities in St. Louis County, Minnesota
Cities in Minnesota
Mining communities in Minnesota
Populated places established in 1892
1892 establishments in Minnesota